Meriden Markham Municipal Airport  is a public-use airport located three miles (5 km) southwest of the central business district of Meriden, a city in New Haven County, Connecticut, United States. This general aviation airport is owned by City of Meriden. It is included in the Federal Aviation Administration (FAA) National Plan of Integrated Airport Systems for 2017–2021, in which it is categorized as a local general aviation facility.

Although most U.S. airports use the same three-letter location identifier for the FAA and IATA, Meriden Markham Municipal Airport is assigned MMK by the FAA but has no designation from the IATA (which assigned MMK to Murmansk Airport in Murmansk, Russia).

History
The history of the airport goes back to at least 1928, when Ernest L. Markham was named the first airport manager; on 14 July 1962 the airport was renamed in honor of Markham for his 32 years of dedicated service.

In the summer of 2020, the airport added new hangars to increase the capacity of hangared aircraft.

Oversight and policies
Operations at MMK are overseen by the Meriden Aviation Commission, which meets the second Tuesday of each month at 6:00 p.m. in the airport terminal building.

Noise abatement procedures are in place at this airport, with pilots being required to fly runway heading until ascending to 1,100 msl.

Operations requires that touch and go type landings are only to be performed on runway 18 due to terrain on the takeoff on runway 36. Full stop landings and takeoffs are permitted on runways 18 and 36.

Facilities and aircraft 

For the 12-month period ending May 30, 2007, the airport had 18,028 aircraft operations, an average of 49 per day: 97% local general aviation, 1% transient general aviation, 1% air taxi and <1% military. There were 70 aircraft based at this airport: 96% single engine, 3% multi-engine and 1% helicopters.

The Connecticut Wing Civil Air Patrol Silver City Cadet Squadron (NER-CT-014) operates out of the airport.

Meriden Aviation Center, located at the airport, provides plane rental services (Piper PA28-161 aircraft) as well as flight instruction.

The fixed-base operator is Mustang Aviation.

References

External links 
Meriden Markham Airport (official website)
Meriden Aviation Services, Inc. (fixed-base operator)

Airports in New Haven County, Connecticut
Buildings and structures in Meriden, Connecticut